Tazeh Kand Rural District may refer to:
 Tazeh Kand Rural District (Parsabad County), Ardabil province
 Tazeh Kand Rural District (Tabriz County), East Azerbaijan province